Arcalis may refer to:

 Arcalis (region), mountain and ski area in the Ordino parish of Andorra
 Arcalís (star), Constellation Bootes; a K0-type subgiant star; aka BD+18°2957, HD 131496, HIP 72845
 Arcalis (horse) (born 2000), a British racehorse

See also 

 Arcadis, design and engineering company
 Arcanis, campaign setting for Dungeons & Dragons.